Joseph Stephen Kodba (February 27, 1922 – September 7, 2005) was an American football player who played at the center and linebacker positions.

A native of Yugoslavia, he attended high school in South Bend, Indiana and played college football for Butler in 1941 and 1942 and Purdue in 1945 and 1946. He served as an Army paratrooper during World War II. He played professional football in the All-America Football Conference (AAFC) for the Baltimore Colts during the 1947 season. He appeared in a total of 13 AAFC games, three as a starter. 

He was the head football coach at Fort Wayne North Side High School in 1948. In 1949, he was hired as an assistant football coach at Niagara University. He later returned to South Bend, Indiana, where he taught for 35 years. After retiring, he moved to Swartz Creek, Michigan, where he died in 2005 at age 83.

References

1922 births
2005 deaths
Baltimore Colts (1947–1950) players
Butler Bulldogs football players
Purdue Boilermakers football players
Yugoslav emigrants to the United States
United States Army personnel of World War II